Elliott Goering Fry (born December 12, 1994) is an American football placekicker for the Arizona Cardinals of the National Football League (NFL). He has played for the Baltimore Ravens, Chicago Bears, Carolina Panthers, Tampa Bay Buccaneers, Kansas City Chiefs, Cincinnati Bengals, and the Alliance of American Football's Orlando Apollos.

Early life and high school 
Fry attended Prince of Peace Christian School in Carrollton, Texas. While Elliott Fry was playing hockey at the age of seven, he lost consciousness on the ice due to extremely high blood glucose levels. Fry was diagnosed with Type 1 diabetes.  Fry was an avid soccer and football player in high school. He was the kicker and punter, but also played a little bit of offense due to his speed.

College 
Fry attended the University of South Carolina where became the all-time leading scorer for the Gamecocks.

Professional career

Orlando Apollos
Fry went 14–14 in his 8 weeks with the Orlando Apollos before the Alliance of American Football suspended operations.

Chicago Bears
Fry was signed by the Chicago Bears on April 12, 2019 to a three-year deal shortly after the departure of Cody Parkey as part of the Bear's preseason kicking competition. During the preseason, he competed with Eddy Piñeiro, but was waived by the Bears shortly after their Week 2 loss to the New York Giants. He made three of four field goals for the Bears.

Baltimore Ravens
Shortly after being waived by the Bears, signed a contract with the Baltimore Ravens. He was cut by the Ravens after their final preseason game against the Washington Redskins.

In October 2019, Fry was selected by the St. Louis BattleHawks in the open phase of the 2020 XFL Draft, but did not sign with the team.

Carolina Panthers
Fry signed a reserve/futures contract with the Carolina Panthers on December 30, 2019. He was waived on April 30, 2020.

Tampa Bay Buccaneers
On May 1, 2020, Fry was claimed off waivers by the Tampa Bay Buccaneers. He was waived on September 1, 2020.

Atlanta Falcons
On October 1, 2020, Fry was signed to the Atlanta Falcons practice squad. He was elevated to the active roster on October 5 for the team's week 4 game against the Green Bay Packers. He made his NFL debut in the game, converting one field goal and going one-for-two on extra point attempts. He reverted to the practice squad the next day. He signed a reserve/future contract on January 4, 2021. On May 12, 2021, Fry was waived by the Falcons.

On September 10, 2021, Fry was signed to the Falcons' practice squad. He was released from their practice squad on September 20, 2021. On October 5, 2021, Fry once again was signed to the Falcons' practice squad. He was released on November 17, 2021.

Kansas City Chiefs
Fry was signed to the Kansas City Chiefs' practice squad on December 14, 2021. He was signed to the active roster on December 20, 2021. After playing only one game for the team, he was released on December 28, 2021.

Green Bay Packers
On January 1, 2022, Fry was signed to the Green Bay Packers practice squad, but was released two days later.

Cincinnati Bengals
On January 4, 2022, Fry was signed to the Cincinnati Bengals practice squad. He was elevated to the Bengals active roster on January 10, 2022 using a standard elevation. He reverted back to the practice squad after the game. He was released on January 31.

Jacksonville Jaguars
On July 29, 2022, Fry signed with the Jacksonville Jaguars. He was waived/injured on August 15, 2022 and placed on injured reserve. He was released on August 19.

Arizona Cardinals
On January 11, 2023, Fry signed a reserve/future contract with the Arizona Cardinals.

Personal life
Fry has Type 1 diabetes, which he was diagnosed with when he was seven years old.

See also
List of people with type 1 diabetes

References

External links
South Carolina bio

1994 births
Living people
American football placekickers
Arizona Cardinals players
Atlanta Falcons players
Baltimore Ravens players
Carolina Panthers players
Chicago Bears players
Cincinnati Bengals players
Green Bay Packers players
Jacksonville Jaguars players
Kansas City Chiefs players
Orlando Apollos players
People from Frisco, Texas
People with type 1 diabetes
Players of American football from Texas
South Carolina Gamecocks football players
Sportspeople from the Dallas–Fort Worth metroplex
Tampa Bay Buccaneers players